

List of Ambassadors
David Akov 2021-
Benny Dagan 2017 -  
Barukh Binah 2013 - 2017
Arthur Avnon 2008 - 2013
David Walzer 2004 - 2008
Carmi Gillon 2001 - 2003
Yitzhak Eldan 1999 - 2001
Avraham Setton 1995 - 1999
Nathan Meron 1991 - 1995
Shamay Cahana 1983 - 1987
Yosefh Hadass 1981 - 1983
Raanan Sivan 1978 - 1981
Itzhak Ben-Ari 1975 - 1978
Esther Herlits 1966 - 1971
Zvi Avnon 1958 - 1961 (Minister 1957 - 1958)
Minister Harry Beilin 1954 - 1957
Minister Yehuda Gaulan 1954 - 1954
Minister Avraham Nissan (Non-Resident, Stockholm) 1950 - 1956

References

Denmark
Israel